The German Red Cross Decoration is a decoration founded in 1922, replaced by the Social Welfare Decoration in 1939 and re-founded in its present form on 8 May 1953.  It is awarded by the German Red Cross.

Badge of Honor of the German Red Cross

Precursor 
After the end of the First World War, according to the provisions of the Weimar Constitution (Art. 109), medals and decorations were no longer allowed to be awarded by the state. At the German Red Cross, however, there was a particularly great need to thank mainly foreign Red Cross representatives for the reconstruction help after the World War by awarding decorations. After intensive consultations with government agencies, the parliamentary parties in the Reichstag and bolstered by reports, the German Red Cross decided at their general meeting in May 1922 to adopt a foundation deed.

See also 
 Red Cross Medal (Prussia)
 Blood Donation Badge of Honor

References 

Red Cross
German Red Cross
Medals of the International Red Cross and Red Crescent Movement
Awards established in 1922

References